Hermotimus may refer to:
 Hermotimus (spider), a genus of spiders
 Hermotimus or Concerning the Sects a  philosophical dialogue written by Lucian of Samosata
 Hermotimus of Pedasa, Xerxes' chief eunuch
 Hermotimus of Clazomenae, an ancient Greek philosopher